Mehdi Benaldjia (born May 14, 1991 in Algiers) is an Algerian football player.

Personal
Benaldjia is the younger brother of footballer Mohamed Billel Benaldjia.

International career
On November 16, 2011, he was selected as part of Algeria's squad for the 2011 CAF U-23 Championship in Morocco.

References

External links
 DZFoot Profile
 

1991 births
Living people
Algerian footballers
Algerian expatriate footballers
Algerian Ligue Professionnelle 1 players
Algerian Ligue 2 players
Saudi Second Division players
Algeria youth international footballers
Algeria under-23 international footballers
Footballers from Algiers
USM Alger players
2011 CAF U-23 Championship players
CR Belouizdad players
Association football midfielders
JS Kabylie players
MC Alger players
DRB Tadjenanet
NA Hussein Dey players
JS Saoura players
Al-Suqoor FC players
Expatriate footballers in Saudi Arabia
Algerian expatriate sportspeople in Saudi Arabia
21st-century Algerian people